Equalization may refer to:

Science and technology
 Bandwidth equalization, in computer networking
 Blind equalization, a digital signal processing technique
 Delay equalization
 Equalization (communications), specific to communications systems
 Equalization (audio), specific to audio signals and sound processing
 Equalizing basin, a reservoir used to regulate water flow below a dam
 Histogram equalization
 RIAA equalization, the RIAA specification for the correct playback of gramophone records

Economics and finance
 Factor price equalization
 Equalization payments
 Equalization pool
 Property tax equalization
 Risk equalization
 Tax equalization of wages across countries
 Interest Equalization Tax

Other
 Equalization of pressure within the ear, a.k.a. ear clearing
 Equalization of pressure in the Diving mask
 Equalization, sharing of load in anchors for rappelling and rock climbing

See also 
 Equalizer (disambiguation)
 Equal (disambiguation)